Ivan Bogun (died 1664) was a Ruthenian Cossack colonel. Close associate and friend of Bogdan Khmelnytsky, he opposed both the pacts with Polish–Lithuanian Commonwealth (Treaty of Hadiach of 1658) and with Tsardom of Russia (Pereiaslav Agreement of 1654).

Biography
Bogun was born into a Cossack-Ruthenian nobility family. He took part in the Khmelnytsky Uprising against Polish rule in Ruthenia. In June 1651 he was elected colonel of troops of Bracław and took part in the Battle of Berestechko against Polish troops led by King John II Casimir Vasa, which the Cossacks lost. Surviving the defeat he regathered his forces and in June 1652 took part in the battle of Batih. In this instance the Cossacks were successful; the Polish commander Marcin Kalinowski was killed and the future hetman Stefan Czarniecki barely escaped with his life. The Polish defeat was complete and allowed the Cossack forces to start a successful offensive and effectively gain control over large parts of Ukraine. Until 1657 Ivan Bogun also led his forces in minor skirmishes against Polish forces, notably at Bratslav and Uman. He also fought against the Crimean Tatars who had switched sides in the effect of the Treaty of Zboriv of 1649 (they were initially allied with the Cossacks but supported the Commonwealth in later year). 

Initially Bogun opposed the Pereiaslav Agreement of 1654. After the Battle of Konotop, Ivan Bogun led an armed pro-Russian uprising against his former ally Ivan Vyhovsky near Konotop and defeated his army in the autumn of 1659. 

After being captured by the Poles in 1663, Bogun was offered freedom in exchange for taking part in a new military campaign against the Tsardom of Russia. During the retreat after the disastrous Siege of Hlukhiv Bogun was executed by a firing squad for handing over important military information to the besieged Russian garrison.

Legacy
Ivan Bogun became a popular Malorussian folk hero, immortalized by Henryk Sienkiewicz in a novel With Fire and Sword where character Jurko Bohun was loosely based on him. In the film based on the novel, directed by Jerzy Hoffman, Bohun was played by Aleksandr Domogarov.

Ivan Bohun is also well described in Bohun, a modern, historical novel about Polish-Cossack wars, written by Jacek Komuda.

His death is still commemorated annually in Lviv.

See also 
 Hetmans of Ukrainian Cossacks
 List of Ukrainian rulers

References

External links

Ivan Bohun at the Encyclopedia of Ukraine
 About Ivan Bohun (in Ukrainian)

1610s births
1664 deaths
People from Vinnytsia Oblast
People from Bracław Voivodeship
Colonels of the Cossack Hetmanate
Cossack rebels
Executed Ukrainian people
Zaporozhian Cossack military personnel of the Khmelnytsky Uprising
Russian people of the Russo-Polish War (1654–1667)
People executed for treason against Poland
People executed by the Polish–Lithuanian Commonwealth
People executed by Poland by firing squad